Mylopotamos may refer to several places in Greece:

Mylopotamos, Crete, a municipality in the Rethymno regional unit in the island of Crete
Mylopotamos, Cyclades, a village on the island of Kea, Cyclades
Mylopotamos, Drama, a village in the Drama regional unit, part of the Drama municipality
Mylopotamos, Kythira, a village in the island of Kythira
Mylopotamos, Magnesia, a village in Magnesia, part of the Mouresi municipality
Mylopotamos, Mount Athos, a settlement in Mount Athos
Neos Mylotopos, a village in the Pella regional unit
Palaios Mylotopos, a village in the Pella regional unit